Pau d'Arco is a municipality in the state of Pará in the Northern region of Brazil.

See also
List of municipalities in Pará
2017 Santa Lúcia massacre

References

Municipalities in Pará